Abd al-Rahman al-Rafai (February 8, 1889 – December 3, 1966) was an Egyptian historian. He dedicated his life to the study of the roles of the national movement in the history of modern Egypt. His most prominent work was 15 volumes in which he documented the state of Egypt from the late 18th century to the mid-19th century. He was born in Cairo even though his family was from the Levant countries. He graduated from the Khadawia school of law in 1908. He spent most of his life in Cairo but moved to Alexandria for high school.immediately after his graduation he practiced law for less than a month until Mohammad Farid  (a prominent lawyer and historian) asked him to become the editor of the Major General Al-San newspaper  and this proved to be the first step in his life as a historian and a politician.

Politics 
In 1907 he became a part of Egyptian national party that was led by Mostafa Kamel Pasha  who was also a journalist and a political figure. At that point al-Rafai started to become concerned with the relationship of national history in terms of national awareness, and the emergence and development of the modern nation-state.

Contributions 
Al-Rafai started writing at an early age. His first book was written in 1912 by the name of The People's Rights  . In this book he showed his political views by writing about issues such as constitutional rule and national independence, rule of law and human rights from different aspects of Islam. He also discussed in his book ideas about the European Enlightenment Era.

His second book Unions of Agricultural Cooperation  was published in 1914. In this book he drew the nation's attention to the importance of development of rural areas is different aspects such as physical, socially and humanly. He also focused on education in this book. Al-Rafai emphasized that education should be guaranteed by the state and should have the priority of improvement over many smaller issues.

Al-Rafai wrote his third book in 1922 titled National Societies  where he spoke about the relationship between the social and political cohesion and economic growth.

His most famous achievement is a 16 volume book that he had started to compose in the 18th century and didn't finish it until his fifties.

Numerous historians have agreed that Al-Rafai researched and collected the most data concerning these topic that could have been known during that period in time and in his circumstances which makes is why his work became a strong basis to the history of systematic in Egypt and the Arab world as a whole.

Footnotes

Literature
 Masr Al Mogahida Fi Al Asr Al Hadith - Dar AL Hilal - 1989

External links 
 Profile on scc.gov.eg.
 https://web.archive.org/web/20110722114336/http://arts.eldoc.ub.rug.nl/FILES/publications/general/Historical/2002/debaets_censor/egypt.pdf
 https://web.archive.org/web/20131104233418/http://moheet.com/show_news.aspx?nid=61858

1889 births
1966 deaths
20th-century Egyptian historians
Historians of Africa
Supply and internal trade ministers of Egypt